Iowa Telecommunications Services, Inc., commonly known as Iowa Telecom, provided local telephone service to former GTE customers in the U.S. states of Iowa, Missouri, Illinois, and Minnesota. Iowa Telecom was founded in 1999 as a partnership between Iowa Network Services and ING Barings. It acquired the assets of GTE Midwest, which served Iowa following Bell Atlantic's purchase of GTE. It had 257,700 access lines and served 435 communities in Iowa.

In 2002 Iowa Telecom bought PC Partner Communications and Zumatel Communications.

On February 7, 2008, Iowa Telecom bought Lakedale Communications, Sherbtel Comminuations, Conntections-ETC, and SOMA, all located in Minnesota. At that time it also acquired Willinet in New York.

On November 24, 2009 Iowa Telecom was acquired by Windstream.

Its telephone directories were published by Pinnacle Publishing.

References

External links
Company website

Companies based in Iowa
Communications in Iowa
Windstream Communications
American companies established in 1999
Telecommunications companies established in 1999
1999 establishments in Iowa
Telecommunications companies of the United States